Hidden Agenda or Hidden Agendas may refer to:

Video games
 Hidden Agenda (1988 video game), a 1988 text-based game
 Hidden Agenda (2017 video game), a thriller video game developed by Supermassive Games for the PlayStation 4

Film
 Hidden Agenda (1990 film), a political thriller directed by Ken Loach and written by Jim Allen
 Hidden Agenda, a 1998 film starring Christopher Plummer
 Hidden Agenda (2001 film), an action film starring Dolph Lundgren

Music
 "Hidden Agenda" (Craig David song)
 "Hidden Agenda" (Pitchshifter song)
 Hidden Agenda Records, an independent record label under Parasol Records
 Hidden Agenda (live house), a quasi-illegal music venue in the industrial area of Kwun Tong, Hong Kong

Television
 Hidden Agenda (game show), a short-lived game show airing on Game Show Network
 "Hidden Agenda", a fictional photograph in the television series Nowhere Man
 "Hidden Agendas" (X-men episode), an episode of the 1990s TV series X-Men

Other
 Hidden Agenda, a student run newspaper at Western Technical-Commercial School in Toronto, Ontario, Canada